The Wyoming Cowboys have had 85 players drafted to the NFL since the first draft in 1936. Of those 84 players, 5 have been selected to a Pro Bowl, and 7 have been a part of a Super Bowl or NFL Championship winning team. Currently, 5 of those draftees still play in the NFL.

The highest drafted Cowboy is Josh Allen, taken 7th overall in 2018 Draft. The most Cowboys ever taken in a draft is 5, in 1968.

Key

Selections

References

Wyoming

Wyoming Cowboys NFL Draft